The Distin Lake Shelter Cabin is a historic backcountry shelter in the Admiralty Island National Monument.  It is located on the northwest shore of Distin Lake, on the Admiralty Island Canoe Route.  The cabin, originally a three-sided Adirondack log shelter, was constructed by a Civilian Conservation Corps crew in 1932.  In 1960, a fourth wall, wooden floor, and bunk beds were added to the structure.  There is a window, and the front door is one recycled from a theater; it is labeled "Balcony" on the inside.

The cabin was listed on the National Register of Historic Places in 1995.  In 2014, it was listed by the United States Forest Service as being in poor condition and unavailable for use.

See also
National Register of Historic Places listings in Hoonah–Angoon Census Area, Alaska

References

1932 establishments in Alaska
Buildings and structures completed in 1932
Civilian Conservation Corps in Alaska
Log cabins in the United States
Buildings and structures on the National Register of Historic Places in Hoonah–Angoon Census Area, Alaska
Park buildings and structures on the National Register of Historic Places in Alaska
Tongass National Forest
Log buildings and structures on the National Register of Historic Places in Alaska